The 1870 Brecon by-election was fought on 13 June 1870.  The by-election was fought due to the Succession to a peerage of the incumbent MP of the Liberal Party, Lord Hyde.  It was won by the Conservative candidate James Gwynne-Holford.

References

1870 in Wales
1870s elections in Wales
History of Powys
Brecknockshire
1870 elections in the United Kingdom
By-elections to the Parliament of the United Kingdom in Welsh constituencies